Romain Métanire (born 28 March 1990) is a professional footballer who plays as a defender. He has previously played in France for FC Metz and Stade de Reims, with whom he won Ligue 2 in 2017–18, as well as in Belgium with KV Kortrijk. Born in France, he represents the Madagascar national team.

Club career

Metz
Métanire was born in Metz, but has origins in Réunion. Having joined FC Metz at the age of six, he started his career in the club's reserve team and made his debut in the Championnat de France amateur (CFA) on 11 October 2008, coming on as a substitute in a 1–1 draw away at Colmar. He made three further substitute appearances in the 2008–09 season as the reserve side was relegated to the CFA 2. He made his first start for Metz B in the 5–2 home win over Pontarlier on 15 August 2009. He went on to play 19 matches during the campaign, becoming a regular fixture in the team that gained promotion back to the CFA as winners of their group. He also scored the first goal of his career in the 2–1 victory away at Troyes B on 21 March 2010.

As a result of his performances in the reserve team, Métanire was selected on the substitutes' bench for the match away at Clermont Foot on 29 October 2010. He entered play in the 89th minute, replacing Belgian midfielder Gaëtan Englebert. He again appeared as a late substitute the following week in the home defeat to Le Mans, before returning to the B team. He played 29 CFA matches for the reserves during the 2010–11 season. Métanire was handed his first senior start in the final Ligue 2 match of the campaign, as Metz were beaten 4–3 away to Evian TG.

In the 2011–12 season, Métanire established himself as Metz' first-choice right-back, starting in all of the side's first 21 matches of the campaign.

On 5 February 2016, he scored a goal against AS Nancy in injury time. In reference to the occasion, t-shirts were sold with the message "Je t’aime comme un but de Métanire à la 91e". In his time at Metz, he made 180 league appearances scoring two goals.

Kortrijk
On 15 July 2016, Métanire left Metz for Belgian club KV Kortrijk.

Reims
On 18 January 2017, after just six months with Kortrijk, Métanire returned to his native France joining Stade Reims on a 1.5-year contract.

Métanire helped Stade de Reims win the 2017–18 Ligue 2 and promote to the Ligue 1 for the 2018–19 season.

Minnesota United
On 25 January 2019, Métanire signed with MLS club Minnesota United. Following the 2022 season, his contract option was declined by Minnesota.

International career
Métanire was born in France, and is of Malagasy descent. He was called up to the Madagascar national team on 11 August 2018. He made his debut for Madagascar in a 2–2 2019 Africa Cup of Nations qualification tie with Senegal on 9 September 2018.

Career statistics

Club

International

Honours
Metz
 Ligue 2: 2013–14, 2017–18

Minnesota United
 U.S. Open Cup runner-up: 2019

Individual
 UNFP Ligue 2 Team of the Year: 2013–14
 MLS All-Star: 2019
 Knight Order of Madagascar: 2019

References

External links
 
 
 
 Romain Métanire career statistics at FootNational
 

1990 births
Living people
Footballers from Metz
People with acquired Malagasy citizenship
French people of Réunionnais descent
French sportspeople of Malagasy descent
Malagasy footballers
French footballers
Association football defenders
Madagascar international footballers
2019 Africa Cup of Nations players
Ligue 1 players
Ligue 2 players
Championnat National players
Belgian Pro League players
Major League Soccer players
FC Metz players
K.V. Kortrijk players
Stade de Reims players
Minnesota United FC players
French expatriate footballers
Malagasy expatriate footballers
French expatriate sportspeople in Belgium
Malagasy expatriate sportspeople in Belgium
Expatriate footballers in Belgium
French expatriate sportspeople in the United States
Malagasy expatriate sportspeople in the United States
Expatriate soccer players in the United States
Recipients of orders, decorations, and medals of Madagascar